Paul Healey (born March 20, 1975) is a Canadian former professional ice hockey winger. He played 77 games in the National Hockey League with the  Philadelphia Flyers, Toronto Maple Leafs, New York Rangers, and Colorado Avalanche between 1996 and 2005. The rest of his career, which lasted from 1995 to 2009, was mainly spent in the minor American Hockey League, though he also played several years in Europe.

Career statistics

Regular season and playoffs

Awards and honours

References

External links
 

1975 births
Ässät players
Canadian ice hockey forwards
Colorado Avalanche players
Edmonton Road Runners players
Florida Everblades players
Hamilton Bulldogs (AHL) players
Hartford Wolf Pack players
Hershey Bears players
HK Acroni Jesenice players
Linköping HC players
Living people
Lowell Lock Monsters players
Milwaukee Admirals players
New York Rangers players
Philadelphia Flyers draft picks
Philadelphia Flyers players
Philadelphia Phantoms players
Prince Albert Raiders players
St. John's Maple Leafs players
San Antonio Rampage players
Ice hockey people from Edmonton
Toronto Maple Leafs players
Vienna Capitals players
Canadian expatriate ice hockey players in Austria
Canadian expatriate ice hockey players in Slovenia
Canadian expatriate ice hockey players in Finland
Canadian expatriate ice hockey players in Sweden